Paulo Artur dos Santos Castro de Campos Rangel (born 18 February 1968 in Vila Nova de Gaia) is a Portuguese jurist and politician of the Social Democratic Party (PSD) who has been serving as a Member of the European Parliament since 2009. He also serves as vice-president of the European People's Party under the leadership of its president Manfred Weber.

Member of the European Parliament, 2009–present
Rangel has been a Member of the European Parliament (MEP) since the 2009 European elections. Upon entering the parliament, he was chosen as one of the vice-presidents of the European People's Party Group.

Rangel has since been serving on the Committee on Constitutional Affairs. In that capacity, he drafted the parliament’s 2010 report on the framework agreement between the European Commission and the Parliament, which demanded that MEPs should be allowed to participate in international negotiations that lead to accords that need parliamentary backing. In 2014, he became the committee’s vice-chairman. In addition, he was elected chairman of the parliament’s delegation for relations with Brazil.

During his time in parliament, Rangel launched a bid for the leadership of the PSD in 2010 but ultimately came second and lost against Pedro Passos Coelho.

Ahead of the 2014 European elections, the PSD named Rangel at the top of their list. In the 2019 European elections, he served as his party’s lead candidate again. He is a 
member of the Working Group on the Conference on the Future of Europe.

Within the European People's Party, Rangel has been chairing the Working Group on EPP Membership since 2016. In this capacity, he notably took the decision to suspend the Fidesz party in 2020. In 2021, he was also appointed to the EPP group's task force for proposing changes to its rules of procedure to allow for “the possibility of the collective termination of membership of a group of Members rather than just individual membership”, alongside Esteban González Pons, Jan Olbrycht, Esther de Lange and Othmar Karas.

Other activities
 RAR Group, Chairman of the Board of the Shareholders’ General Meeting
 Associação Comercial do Porto (ACP), Member of the Board

Personal life
In 2021, Paulo Rangel publicly came out about his homosexuality.

References

External links
 

1968 births
Living people
People from Vila Nova de Gaia
MEPs for Portugal 2009–2014
MEPs for Portugal 2014–2019
Social Democratic Party (Portugal) MEPs
Knights Commander of the Order of Merit of the Federal Republic of Germany
MEPs for Portugal 2019–2024
Portuguese LGBT politicians
Gay politicians
LGBT legislators
LGBT conservatism